Platycerium grande, the giant staghorn fern, capa de leon (Spanish: lion's cape), and dapong repolyo (Filipino: air cabbage), is a species of epiphytic fern in the family Polypodiaceae. It is one of the two staghorn ferns native to the Philippines, along with P. coronarium, and is endemic to the island of Mindanao, in the provinces of Zamboanga, Lanao and Davao. P. grande is often collected from the forests and sold as a highly prized ornamental plant. Due to overcollection and the difficulty of the spores to
germinate under natural conditions, in vitro technique is necessary to ensure mass production of this plant species. The local government categorized it as critically endangered species.

Gallery

References

grande
Endemic flora of the Philippines
Plants described in 1850